Saint-Rémy-lès-Chevreuse (literally Saint-Rémy near Chevreuse) is a commune in the Yvelines department, in the Île-de-France region of north-central France.

Saint-Rémy-lès-Chevreuse station is the southwestern endpoint of the RER B line from Paris.

Population

Notable people
Pierre de Coubertin (1863–1937), often considered by some the father of the modern Olympic Games.
Eugène Imbert (1821–1898), 19th-century chansonnier, died here
André Wogenscky (1916–2004), French Modernist architect, and member of the Académie des beaux-arts.
Marta Pan (1923–2008), French abstract sculptor of Hungarian origin.

See also
Communes of the Yvelines department

References

External links

Communes of Yvelines